Artena convergens is a species of moth of the family Erebidae. It is found in Thailand, Peninsular Malaysia, Sumatra, Borneo and New Guinea.

Subspecies
Artena convergens convergens
Artena convergens nicanora (New Guinea)

External links
 Species info

Catocalinae
Moths described in 1917
Moths of Asia